Stone County Courthouse may refer to:

Stone County Courthouse (Arkansas), Mountain View, Arkansas
Stone County Courthouse (Mississippi), Wiggins, Mississippi
Stone County Courthouse (Missouri), Galena, Missouri